Gim Byeongju may refer to:

Kim Byung-joo (Hanja: 金炳周, born 1968), South Korean judoka
Michael Kim (businessman) (Hanja: 金秉奏, born 1963), South Korean billionaire